The Herreshoff Bull's Eye or Bullseye, is  an American trailerable sailboat that was designed by Nathanael Greene Herreshoff and first built in 1914.

The design is derived from the Herreshoff 12½ and was later developed into the Herreshoff Goldeneye.

Production
The design was originally built out of wood by the Herreshoff Manufacturing Company in the United States. In 1938 the design was given an above-transom tiller and renamed the Fishers Island Sound Bull's Eye. It was also built at the Quincy Adams Yacht Yard, in Quincy, Massachusetts. In 1947 the rights were purchased by Cape Cod Shipbuilding and a new fiberglass version, called the Cape Cod Bull's Eye, was created by the original designer's son, A. Sidney DeWolf Herreshoff. This model includes a cuddy cabin and a modern marconi rig with aluminum spars.

While the deck and rigging has changed over the production run of more than 100 years, the hull design has remained the same.

By 1994, 2,000 wooden boats had been built, plus 800 from fiberglass. The design remains in production.

Design
The Bull's Eye is a recreational keelboat, built predominantly of wood and later of fiberglass, with teak wood trim. It has a fractional sloop rig, a spooned raked stem , a raked transom, a keel-mounted rudder controlled by a tiller and a fixed long keel. It displaces  and carries  of lead ballast.

Buoyancy tanks are installed  in the bow and under the cockpit floor for safety. In post 1947 models a cuddy cabin is provided for stowage, in addition to the lazarette, which is accessed via a teak hatch.

For sailing the design is equipped with a self-tending  jib, or a  genoa and may use a  spinnaker.

The boat has a factory option of a trailer that may be used for ground transportation.

Operational history
The design is supported by an active class club, the Bullseye Class Association and is raced in Florida, Maine, Massachusetts, New Jersey, as well as on the waters of Long Island Sound.

In a 1994 review Richard Sherwood described the boat as, "a New England classic, designed stiff and heavy for the short, choppy seas of Buzzards Bay."

See also
List of sailing boat types

Related development
Herreshoff 12½

References

External links

Official website

Keelboats
1910s sailboat type designs
Sailing yachts
Trailer sailers
Sailboat type designs by Nathanael Greene Herreshoff
Sailboat type designs by A. Sidney DeWolf Herreshoff
Sailboat types built by Cape Cod Shipbuilding
Sailboat types built by Quincy Adams Yacht Yard
Sailboat types built by Herreshoff Manufacturing